Pin Up Girl may refer to:

 Pin-up model
 Pin Up Girl (film), a 1944 American musical film starring Betty Grable